The 2008 Bulldogs RLFC season was the 74th in the club's history. They competed in the NRL's 2008 Telstra Premiership, finishing in last place.

Season summary 
High-profile player departures and political infighting during the 2007-2008 off-season had led to predictions that the Bulldogs would have a difficult 2008, predictions which were borne out across the season. The club languished towards the bottom of the ladder throughout the year, suffering heavy losses against many teams, the most notable being a 46-0 loss to the Melbourne Storm, a 58-18 loss to the Canberra Raiders and a 56-4 loss against the Wests Tigers, breaking records. The key problems for the Bulldogs were poor defence and continuing injury problems, with usually 10 first grade players injured at a time, including season ending injuries to key players Luke Patten and Willie Tonga. After the club's 58-18 thrashing at the hands of the Raiders in Round 15, coach Steve Folkes admitted that the Bulldogs were "at the bottom of a fairly big hole with no way out of it in the short term". Folkes' men would only win one more game in the entire season, and finished 2008 with the wooden spoon in what was Folkes' final year with the club. It was the Bulldogs' first wooden spoon since 1964, discounting 2002 when it breached the salary cap and were stripped of all competition points.

On the field the Bulldogs suffered a season of unrelenting disappointment, leading to just five wins for the entire season. Other than the record-breaking losses already mentioned above, the Bulldogs suffered its first loss against St. George Illawarra since 2003, and lost twice against the Sydney Roosters, Parramatta Eels (in the first meeting the Bulldogs had a 20-0 halftime lead but somehow lost 28-20), Penrith Panthers and Canberra Raiders throughout the course of the season. The loss to the Roosters in particular was made bitter notably because Willie Mason and Mark O'Meley were playing against the Bulldogs for the first time. The Bulldogs however did win two of their opening three matches against the South Sydney Rabbitohs and Wests Tigers, raising optimism amongst fans. The other three wins were against those that would make the finals: the Dragons in round six, the Sharks in round 11 and the Broncos at Suncorp Stadium in round 18. No more wins would follow for the season. The Bulldogs' highest score for the season in a single match was 34 when it lost for the second time to Canberra, 52-34. Their highest in a winning match was 32, when it defeated the Wests Tigers in round 3, by 32-12. Further souring the Bulldogs' season of shame, Sonny Bill Williams left the club without warning late in July to pursue a career in rugby union (read more below).

The team also faced off-field turbulence. Throughout May and June, there was heavy media coverage of star player Sonny Bill Williams' discontent with Bulldogs management and with his contract arrangements, and of his rumoured desire to leave the club to play rugby union or in the Super League. After confirming that he would play out the remaining 4 years of his contract, Williams left the country without warning in late July to join French rugby union club RC Toulon, in what many rugby league fans regarded as an enormous betrayal. The Bulldogs commenced legal action against Williams for breach of contract, and eventually received substantial compensation for the walkout.

Match results 
ANZ Stadium is a home ground of five NRL teams (the Bulldogs as well as South Sydney Rabbitohs, Wests Tigers, St George Illawarra Dragons and Parramatta Eels), and therefore the Bulldogs are not officially classified as the home team at every match they play there. ANZ Stadium matches at which the Bulldogs are classified as the home team are highlighted in bold.

Season ladder

Scorers 
For NRL first-grade matches only.

Stats to the end of Round 23, NRL, 2008

Squad 

Bold Players have played International or State any year

Player movements

Gains 2009

Losses 2009

Off Contract at end of 2009

Off Contract at end of 2010

Off Contract at end of 2011

See also 
 List of Canterbury-Bankstown Bulldogs seasons

References

External links 
 Bulldogs

Canterbury-Bankstown Bulldogs seasons
Bulldogs RLFC season